Mill Hill railway station is a disused station in Cowes on the Isle of Wight.

History
It opened in 1871 and was first seen as the down train from the main Cowes railway station emerged from the 208 yard tunnel along the curving platform, the sweep still visible in 2005 on a small area of grass where the demolished station  once stood. Unlike many of the Island's railway stations, Mill Hill was busy at the beginning and end of each working day, depositing and picking up hundreds of workmen from shipyards.

Conversely, after passenger closure in 1966 a single employee spent six months on duty at the crossing just past the station with not one chance to open it, although freight traffic continued to Medina Wharf for a few months after passenger trains were withdrawn.

Stationmasters
William Henry Strawn ca. 1879 ca. 1880 (afterwards station master at Haven Street)
John William Gibbs ca. 1896
F. Williams ca. 1910
Percy Hawkins ca. 1920

See also 
 List of closed railway stations in Britain

References

External links
 Pictures of Mill Hill

Disused railway stations on the Isle of Wight
Former Isle of Wight Central Railway stations
Railway stations in Great Britain opened in 1862
Railway stations in Great Britain closed in 1966
Beeching closures in England
1862 establishments in England